The Formosa 1 Offshore Wind Farm is a 128 MW offshore wind power station in Miaoli County, Taiwan. It is Taiwan's first offshore wind farm.

History
The Changhua County Government signed a memorandum of understanding with Macquarie Formosa 1 and Swancor Renewable Energy in March 2017 to invest NT$210 billion to the Formosa 1 Offshore Wind Farm project. The Macquarie Group then secured funding in June 2018 for the project from local and international banks.

K2 Management was appointed as the consultant and Sinotech Engineering Consultants was appointed as the EPC contractor for the project. Sinotech then subcontracted the turbine foundation design to COWI.

The first phase of the wind turbines were installed in November 2016 and commenced operation in April 2017 with a total installed capacity of 8 MW.

The second phase of the project started in end of May 2019, expected to expand another 120 MW of electricity generations capacity. It was commissioned at the end of 2019.

Architecture
The wind power station was installed 6 km offshore of Miaoli County in the Taiwan Straits over an area of 11 km2.

Technical specifications
The total installed capacity of the first phase is 8 MW, consists of two wind turbines from Siemens. Each turbine has a 120 m diameter rotor, 58.5 m long rotor blades and 11,300 m2 swept area. The turbines are installed on monopile foundations. The wind turbine performance is constantly monitored from Brande, Denmark.

Additional 20 turbines with rated capacity of 6 MW each (120 MW in total) has been installed as the Phase 2 program as of October 2019. This was commissioned at end of 2019. Each turbine foundation has a crane to hoist tools and equipment for maintenance.

Finance
The wind power stations distributes the generated power to Taiwan Power Company based on feed-in tariff agreed in a power purchase agreement for 20 years. The wind farm is jointly owned by Ørsted (35%), JERA Co. (32.5%), Macquarie Capital (25%) and Swancor (7%).

See also
 Renewable energy in Taiwan
 Electricity sector in Taiwan

References

2017 establishments in Taiwan
Buildings and structures in Miaoli County
Energy infrastructure completed in 2017
Wind farms in Taiwan